Goryayevskaya is a rural locality (a village) in Zaborskoye Rural Settlement, Tarnogsky District, Vologda Oblast, Russia. Its population was 69 as of 2002.

Geography 
Goryayevskaya is located 22 km west of Tarnogsky Gorodok, the district's administrative centre. Krasnoye is the nearest rural locality.

References 

Rural localities in Tarnogsky District